Spider-Woman is the code name of several fictional characters in comic books published by Marvel Comics. The first and original version is Jessica Drew (later impersonated by Veranke), the second version is Julia Carpenter, and the third version is Mattie Franklin. Several alternate reality incarnations of the character have additionally received notoriety, including the Ultimate Spider-Woman, Ashley Barton, and Gwen Stacy.

Publication history
Marvel Comics' then-publisher Stan Lee said in 1978, shortly after Spider-Woman's debut in Marvel Spotlight #32 (Feb. 1977) and the start of the character's 50-issue self-titled series (cover-dated April 1978 – June 1983), the character originated because,

Following that initial Spider-Woman series, more followed. Volume two was a miniseries published from November 1993 through February 1994; volume three was published from July 1999 through December 2000; and volume four, featuring Jessica Drew, the original Spider-Woman, was published from November 2009 through May 2010.

Volume Five ran from November 2014 through the fall of 2015, featuring Jessica Drew as Spider-Woman. In the March 2015 issue of The Amazing Spider-Man Vol. 3 #13, Jessica boasts "I have never needed rescuing. Ever. See my wiki entry." In November 2015, Spider-Woman Vol. 6 launched as part of Marvel's All-New, All-Different event with the same creative team as Volume 5. This volume saw her wearing the same costume as in Volume 5, but now she was pregnant and working as a private investigator. In October 2020, Spider-Woman #5, the fifth issue of Volume 7, being written by Karla Pacheco, marked the 100th issue of the title and Marvel celebrated the occasion with a special giant-sized issue.

Spider-Women

Jessica Drew

Jessica Drew, the original Spider-Woman who left the role in the early 1980s and returned to her mantle by the late 2000s. This version starred in her own animated TV series in 1979 (which is not to be confused with the similarly named Web Woman animated series of the same time period).

Julia Carpenter

Julia Carpenter, the second Spider-Woman who was a former member of the Avengers and Omega Flight and also used the Arachne and Madame Web mantles.

Mattie Franklin

Mattie Franklin, who briefly impersonated the then-retired Spider-Man before receiving her own short-lived comics series. Mattie also appeared in Alias #16–21, before going on to appear in the 2007–2008 Loners miniseries. Currently deceased.

Charlotte Witter
Charlotte Witter, a supervillain who used the Spider-Woman name.

Veranke

Veranke, queen of the shape-shifting extraterrestrial race the Skrulls who impersonated Jessica Drew over a long period of time and was a founding member of a superhero team. Currently deceased.

Ultimate Marvel

An Ultimate Marvel version of Spider-Woman is featured with the Ultimate continuity. This version, known by various names, is a gender-swapped clone of the Peter Parker of the Ultimate Universe. She joins the Avengers and takes on the mantle of Black Widow, before returning to the Spider-Woman name.

Gwen Stacy

In the 2014 series "Spider-Verse", Gwen Stacy of Earth-65 is bitten by the radioactive spider instead of Peter Parker, being her universe's version of Spider-Woman. She is featured in her own solo series Spider-Gwen.

Other versions

Helen Goddard
An unrelated earlier "Spider-Woman" was published by Harry "A" Chesler's Dynamic Comics in 1944. She was a non-superpowered crime-fighter named Helen Goddard and made her first and only appearance in the Golden Age comic book Major Victory #1.

Spider Super Stories
A character called "Spider-Woman" (Valerie the Librarian) appears in the recurring live-action skit "Spidey Super Stories" on the 1970s PBS children's television series The Electric Company. She also appears as Spider-Woman in the spin-off comic book series Spidey Super Stories #11 (August 1975). She has no superpowers.

Mary Jane Watson

There are several alternate versions of Mary Jane Watson known as Spider-Woman. The first version is a ninja of the Spider-clan in the Marvel Mangaverse, and another version is featured in the Exiles series.

Ashley Barton

In the pages of Old Man Logan, Ashley is the daughter of Tonya Parker and Hawkeye who did not like the way that Kingpin was running Hammer Falls. She becomes "Spider-Bitch", allying herself with a new Punisher and Daredevil, and plans to take back Hammer Falls, only for the group to be captured and Daredevil and Punisher to be fed to the carnivorous dinosaurs. Hawkeye breaks his daughter out of her cell, whereafter Ashley immediately beheads Kingpin which avenges Daredevil and Punisher's deaths. Then she attempts to kill her father, before taking over Hammer Falls as the new Kingpin. Old Man Logan rescues Hawkeye as Ashley sends her men after them.

The character appears in the "Spider-Verse" and Spider-Geddon storylines, now referred with her father's surname as Ashley Barton, and alternately referred to as "Spider-Girl" and "Spider-Woman" due to the family-friendly nature of the narrative, and is among the spider-powered characters who are recruited by Superior Spider-Man (Doctor Octopus's mind in Peter Parker's body) to help fight the Inheritors, before returning to the Wastelands in "Venomverse" and "Old Man Quill".

Mayday Parker

Peter and MJ's daughter from the alternate future MC2, commonly known as Spider-Girl, began calling herself Spider-Woman after her father's death.

Earth X
On Earth X, a character named Spidra appears. She was one of the last survivors of the Microverse following Psycho-Man's attempt to drive the entire realm mad. Escaping with the rest of the Ant Men, who were formerly known as the Microns, Spidra and the rest of the Ant Men are charged with watching Immortus. They are later present at the wedding of King Britain and Medusa.

Squadron Supreme
In the Squadron Supreme series, Nell Ruggles was a young troubled girl, who upon gaining her powers killed her classmates, who had bullied her in the past. However, her superhuman powers allowed her to be traced back to a device which the Icarus One astronauts brought back from the Moon. Running away from home, she was captured by the Blur and turned over to Nick Fury's S.H.I.E.L.D. Thanks to an electroshock collar, she has been prevented from leaving, though she appears to be making the best of the situation, having made friends and eventually falling in love with Tucker Ford, Biogeneral.

In other media

Television
 The Jessica Drew incarnation of Spider-Woman appears in a self-titled self-titled TV series, voiced by Joan Van Ark.
 The Julia Carpenter incarnation of Spider-Woman appears in Iron Man, voiced by Casey DeFranco in season one and Jennifer Hale in season two.
 The Mary Jane Watson incarnation of Spider-Woman, also referenced as Spider-MJ, appears in Ultimate Spider-Man, voiced by Tara Strong.

Film
 The Gwen Stacy incarnation of Spider-Woman appears in Spider-Man: Into the Spider-Verse, voiced by Hailee Steinfeld.
 The Gwen Stacy and Jessica Drew incarnations of Spider-Woman appear in Spider-Man: Across the Spider-Verse, voiced again by Hailee Steinfeld and Issa Rae respectively.
 The Jessica Drew and Gwen Stacy incarnations of Spider-Woman will appear in a female-centered spin-off of Spider-Man: Into the Spider-Verse.

Video games
 The Jessica Drew incarnation of Spider-Woman appears as a playable character in Marvel: Ultimate Alliance, voiced by Tasia Valenza. This version possesses her comic book counterpart's powers except her super-strength. Additionally, Julia Carpenter's Arachne suit and Mayday Parker's Spider-Girl suit also appear as alternate skins. Originally, Mattie Franklin's costume was intended to be one of the alternate costumes, but was replaced by Spider-Girl's. 
 The Jessica Drew incarnation of Spider-Woman appears in the PS2 and PSP versions of Spider-Man: Web of Shadows voiced by Mary Elizabeth McGlynn.
 The Jessica Drew incarnation of Spider-Woman appears in Marvel: Ultimate Alliance 2, voiced by Elizabeth Daily.
 Jessica Drew / Spider-Woman and Julia Carpenter / Arachne appear as playable characters in Marvel Super Hero Squad Online.
 The Jessica Drew incarnation of Spider-Woman appears as a playable character in Marvel: Avengers Alliance.
 The Jessica Drew incarnation of Spider-Woman is a playable character in Lego Marvel Super Heroes, voiced by Kari Wahlgren.
 Gwen Stacy, Mayday Parker, Julia Carpenter, Charlotte Witter, Mattie Franklin, Ashley Barton, and both the mainstream and Ultimate versions of Jessica Drew all appear as playable characters in Spider-Man Unlimited, with Jessica Drew voiced by Laura Bailey.
 The Jessica Drew and Gwen Stacy incarnations of Spider-Woman appear as playable characters in Marvel Heroes, voiced by Ashley Johnson.
 The Jessica Drew and Gwen Stacy incarnations of Spider-Woman appear as playable characters in Marvel Puzzle Quest.
 The Ultimate Marvel incarnation of Jessica Drew / Spider-Woman, referred to as "Spider-Girl" for unknown reasons, appears as a playable character in Lego Marvel's Avengers as part of the Spider-Man DLC pack.
 The Gwen Stacy incarnation of Spider-Woman appears as a playable character in Marvel Ultimate Alliance 3: The Black Order.

Miscellaneous
 Spidey Super Stories #56 (January 1982) features Mary Jane Watson dressed as the Jessica Drew incarnation of Spider-Woman for a costume party.
 The Jessica Drew incarnation of Spider-Woman was among ten Marvel characters who appeared in a set of Marvel Comics Super Heroes commemorative postage stamps that were issued in 2007.
 An English version of Jessica Drew / Spider-Woman appears in the Spider-Woman: Agent of S.W.O.R.D. motion comic, voiced by Nicolette Reed.

See also
Marvel characters utilizing the Spider-Woman identity
 Spider-Girl (Mayday Parker), daughter of Spider-Man / Peter Parker and Mary Jane Watson in a possible future who starts calling herself Spider-Woman after the events of "Spider-Verse".
 Spider-Woman (Gwen Stacy), commonly referred to as "Spider-Gwen" and "Ghost Spider".

Other female spider-themed Marvel characters
 Spider-Girl (Anya Corazon), previously Araña
 Madame Web (Cassandra Webb), grandmother of Charlotte Witter
 Black Widow (Natasha Romanoff)
 Spider-Queen (Ana Soria)
 Black Widow (Yelena Belova)
 She-Venom (Anne Weying)
 Tarantula (Maria Vasquez)
 Silk (Cindy Moon)
 SP//dr (Peni Parker)

References

External links
 Spider-Woman at the Marvel Universe
 Spider-Woman vol.4 online at Rucomics.info
 Spider-Woman at the Marvel Database Project
 Spider-Woman (Jessica Drew) at Don Markstein's Toonopedia. Archived from the original on August 2, 2017.
 
 
 
 
 
 Spider-Woman sales figures for 1979–1982 at the Comics Chronicles

 
Comics about women
Comics spin-offs
Comics characters introduced in 1977
1977 comics debuts
Spider-Man characters code names
Marvel Comics female superheroes
Marvel Comics female supervillains
Articles about multiple fictional characters

es:Spider-Woman (desambiguación)
fr:Spider-Woman
it:Donna ragno
pt:Mulher-Aranha
fi:Hämähäkkinainen